Fortune Bay—Cape La Hune is a provincial electoral district for the House of Assembly of Newfoundland and Labrador, Canada. When created in 1975 it was called Fortune-Hermitage. As of 2011, there are 6,053 eligible voters living within the district.

The district covers a larger section of Newfoundland's south coast. The district includes territory east of Burgeo, and stretches to the end of Fortune Bay near the beginning of the Burin Peninsula.

The district covers a number of communities including: Harbour Breton, Seal Cove, and Hermitage-Sandyville in Connaigre; St. Albans, Milltown-Head of Bay d'Espoir, Morrisville, St. Joseph's Cove, and St. Veronica's in Bay d'Espoir; along with Belleoram, Pool's Cove, and St. Jacques-Coomb's Cove (St. Jacques, English Harbour West, Mose Ambrose, Boxey, Coomb's Cove, and Wreck Cove) in Fortune Bay.

The Miawpukek First Nation reserve of Samiajij Miawpukek (Conne River) in Bay d'Espoir is located in the district.

The district contains intra-provincial ferries servicing Rencontre East, Gaultois, and McCallum. Francois, another isolated community in the district, can also be accessed via McCallum through the Francois – Grey River – Burgeo ferry route.

Members of the House of Assembly

Former District of Hermitage

Former District of Fortune/Fortune Bay

Former District of Fortune Bay - Hermitage/Fortune and Hermitage

Election results 

|-

|-

|-
 
|NDP
|Sheldon Hynes
|align="right"|84
|align="right"|2.09%
|align="right"|
|}

|-
|}

|-
|}

References

External links 
Website of the Newfoundland and Labrador House of Assembly

Newfoundland and Labrador provincial electoral districts